Housekeeping vs. The Dirt is a 2006 collection of essays from The Believer written by Nick Hornby. It follows on from another collection of columns from the same magazine entitled The Polysyllabic Spree.

References

2006 non-fiction books
McSweeney's books
Essay collections
Works by Nick Hornby
Books of literary criticism